Uzoechi Osisioma "Uzo" Emenike (born 9 November 1994), professionally known by his stage name MNEK, is a British singer, songwriter and record producer. He has been nominated for a Grammy and a Brit Award, and has received the ASCAP Vanguard Award. His writing and production credits include H.E.R., Jax Jones, Zara Larsson, Little Mix, Dua Lipa, FLO, Sugababes, Clean Bandit, Julia Michaels, Craig David, Christina Aguilera, Becky Hill, Selena Gomez, Years & Years, Kylie Minogue, Beyoncé, Madonna, KSI, Mabel and Twice.

Career

2011–2013: Breakthrough
His stage name is a gramogram of his surname, Emenike.

In an interview with Build LDN, MNEK talked about his introduction into the music industry and how, at first, he did not even know what a publisher was. He stated, "I started writing poems and writing songs around the age of 8 or 7 and I started playing around with production software from really young as well. I then put some stuff up on Myspace finally when I was 14. There were two songs I had. I sent them out to all my favourite artists on Myspace and it just landed on this artist at the time called CocknBullKid, but she's now Anita Blay and she's an amazing songwriter. She was like "Okay, cool. I'm just gonna send this to my publisher" and at the time I had no idea what a publisher was. So she sent it and that was that and it became this flurry of people wanting to be my publisher and then that was me in the industry, but then I've had to grow in the industry at the same time – I've been learning on the job – because I was still in school and all that stuff. I was managing how to work that around it because my parents weren't gonna let me leave school."

In 2011, when he was 16, he began writing and working with production group Xenomania and contributed to Florrie's 2011 extended play Experiments, which first labelled him professionally as a songwriter. Shortly after, his work with Xenomania earned him his break out when he worked with top acts The Saturdays and The Wanted. He also released his debut single "If Truth Be Told" in November of that year.

In 2012, he worked with singer and songwriter A*M*E on her debut single "City Lights", featuring MNEK's brother Bartoven, and she became one of MNEK's first affiliates. In February, he was labelled as a featured performer on Rudimental's single "Spoons", alongside Syron. The song features on their 2013 debut album Home, where he also featured on the song "Baby", alongside Sinead Harnett, and also worked on the songs "Hell Could Freeze" and "Hide".

In 2013, MNEK contributed to the song "Need U (100%)", featuring A*M*E, and became his biggest contribution since working with The Saturdays. He was also labelled one of 15 artists to make BBC's Sound of 2014 long list.

2014–2015: Small Talk
In January 2014, he featured on Gorgon City's single "Ready for Your Love". The song peaked at number 4 on the UK Singles Chart. On 20 April 2014, he premiered "Every Little Word" on 1Xtra, the "buzz" single from his debut studio album. On 9 May 2014, the remix EP, featuring Joe Goddard and Fred V & Grafix among others was released. Emenike has said we can expect to hear collaborations with Moko, Snakehips and Jimmy Napes on the record. The lead single "Wrote a Song About You" premiered on Annie Mac's BBC Radio 1 show on 13 June 2014. In June 2014, Oliver Heldens' track "Gecko (Overdrive)", which MNEK wrote, debuted at number one on both the UK Dance Chart and the UK Singles Chart. In 2014, he also worked with Madonna on her album Rebel Heart, and produced the song "Feels So Good" by Kylie Minogue, from her album Kiss Me Once. On 22 July 2014, MNEK released the promotional single "In Your Clouds" as part of an iTunes Ones to Watch campaign. The song will feature on his debut studio album. His debut extended play (EP) Small Talk was released on 20 March 2015. In March 2015, JoJo announced that she worked with MNEK on her new studio album.

In July 2015, MNEK released "Never Forget You" with Swedish singer Zara Larsson. The single premiered as Annie Mac's Hottest Record on BBC Radio 1 and to date has been certified Platinum in the UK, 3× Platinum in Sweden, 2× Platinum in Australia and Denmark and Platinum in Norway. In the US, "Never Forget You" has been certified Platinum, reaching the number one spot on the Billboard Dance/Electronic Songs chart for three consecutive weeks and the top 10 of the national airplay chart.

2016–present: Songwriting breakthrough and Language
After the success of his Zara Larsson collaboration, he began working with other artists as a songwriter, beginning with his contribution to Beyoncé's 2016 song "Hold Up". He also went on to form songwriting partnerships with artists including Becky Hill, Leo Kalyan, Shift K3Y, Ryan Ashley, Jax Jones, and Brayton Bowman.

In 2016, he released his first solo single since his debut extended play, entitled "At Night (I Think About You)". Shortly after, he also released a cover of the renowned Queen single "Don't Stop Me Now". "At Night (I Think About You)" peaked at number 87 on the UK Singles Chart. After releasing the song, he stated that he was recording and producing his debut album.

In 2017, he released another single, entitled "Paradise", which samples Ultra Naté's 1997 hit "Free", as well as the collaborative single "Deeper" with Riton and the House Gospel Choir.

In February 2018, he teased the single "Tongue", which was revealed to be the lead single from his debut album, Language. He stated in an interview with Annie Mac that his album was finished and that he was mixing the album with mixing engineer Phil Tan. It was released on 7 September 2018.

In July 2019, MNEK hosted a songwriting camp for LGBT singer-songwriters in association with Pride In Music. The aim of the camp was to help emerging LGBT talent find a safe space to work in, as MNEK himself has experienced judgment from within the industry due to his sexual orientation. Participants in the event included L Devine, Olly Alexander, and Rina Sawayama.

In 2020, MNEK collaborated with Joel Corry on the song "Head & Heart", which peaked at number one on the Official UK Charts, making it MNEK's first ever vocal effort to take the number one spot, despite getting very close with his other top ten featured or collaborative appearances with Stormzy, Zara Larsson and Gorgon City. 

In 2021, MNEK appeared as a guest vocal coach on the second series of RuPaul's Drag Race UK. On 11 May 2021, the Sugababes released a reworking of 2001 single "Run for Cover" featuring MNEK to celebrate the 20th anniversary of their debut album One Touch and plans for new music.

In June 2021, it was announced that MNEK would be appearing alongside Olly Alexander on the third series of Celebrity Gogglebox which airs on Channel 4. In 2022, MNEK produced a number of tracks on Island Records new girl group FLO EP "The Lead", including singles "Cardboard Box" and "Immature".

Discography

 Language (2018)

See also
 MNEK production discography

Awards and nominations

Personal life 
Emenike came out as gay when he was 19. Emenike has established a songwriting camp for LGBTQ+ singer-songwriters in association with Pride in Music, which collaborates with other influential artists like Rina Sawayama. He wants to reach out to young adults figuring out their sexuality.

Notes

References

External links
 MNEKofficial.com
 

Living people
1994 births
21st-century Black British male singers
English people of Igbo descent
English record producers
British male songwriters
English gay musicians
Gay singers
Gay songwriters
LGBT Black British people
English LGBT singers
English LGBT songwriters
People from Lewisham
Singers from London
MNEK
20th-century LGBT people
21st-century LGBT people
Capitol Records artists
Moshi Moshi Records artists
Virgin EMI Records artists